Earl Farwell Dodge Jr. (December 24, 1932 – November 7, 2007) was an American politician who served as the Prohibition Party's chairman and presidential candidate from the 1984 to 2000 presidential elections and later ran with the nomination of his own faction during the 2004 presidential election.

Early life

Earl Farwell Dodge Jr. was born on December 24, 1932, to Earl Farwell and Dorothy May Harris in Malden, Massachusetts. He attended school until the tenth grade and on July 20, 1951, he married Barbara Regan. In 1952, he joined the Prohibition Party after attending a rally hosted by future Prohibition vice-presidential nominee Mark R. Shaw.

Career

Politics
From 1953 to 1956, he served as the executive secretary of the Massachusetts Prohibition Party and ran for Massachusetts Secretary of State in 1956. In 1956, he moved to Indiana and from 1958 to 1961, he served as the chairman of the Indiana Prohibition Party and ran for Indiana's second congressional district in 1960. From 1961 to 1962, he lived in Denver, Colorado. From 1962 to 1966, he worked for the National Christian Citizens Committee and ran for the United States Senate.

From 1958 to 1962, he served as the co-chairman of the Prohibition Party under E. Harold Munn. In 1967, he was appointed to the Kalamazoo Community Relations Board and served until 1970. In 1974, he was appointed to the Colorado State Elections Advisory Board. In 1979, he was selected to serve as the chairman of the National Statesman Party, which the Prohibition Party had changed its name to in 1977, and served until 2003.

He also ran for the governorship of Colorado with the Prohibition nomination in every election from 1974 to 1994 except for in 1990. In 1990, he ran in Colorado's Senate election while his daughter, Karen J. Thiessen, ran for state Treasurer, his son, Calvin G. Dodge, ran for Secretary of State, and Calvin's wife, Elsi, ran for the regent of Colorado University.

Presidential
During the 1976 and 1980 presidential elections he was given the vice-presidential nomination of the Prohibition Party.

On June 24, 1983, forty five delegates voted to give Dodge the presidential nomination in Mandan, North Dakota, for the 1984 presidential election and on January 3, 1984, he suffered a heart attack, but recovered. He appeared on the ballots in North Dakota, New Mexico, Kansas, Arkansas, and Colorado and as a write-in candidate in Ohio and received 4,236 votes.

During the 1988 presidential election he was given the party's presidential nomination again and appeared on the ballot in Arkansas, Tennessee, New Mexico, and Colorado and received 8,002 votes. During the 1992 presidential election he appeared on the ballot in Arkansas, Tennessee, and New Mexico and only received 961 votes. During the 1996 presidential election he appeared on the ballot in Colorado, Arkansas, Tennessee, and Utah and received 1,298 votes.

From June 28 to 30, 1999, around thirty delegates attended the national convention in Bird-in-Hand, Pennsylvania, and nine voted to give Dodge the presidential nomination against eight voting for Gary R. Van Horn and the vice-presidential nomination to W. Dean Watkins. He attempted to win the Independent American Party presidential nomination to receive ballot access in Utah, but was defeated by U.S. Taxpayers' Party presidential nominee Howard Phillips and in the general election he only appeared on the ballot in Colorado and received 208 votes.

2004 and 2008 presidential campaigns
During his tenure as chairman of the party Dodge was criticized by members for his financial actions. He avoided paying the Social Security tax on money earned through his involvement in the Prohibition Party by laundering it through the National Prohibition Foundation. During Earl Higgerson's ten years as treasurer Dodge refused to allow him to see the party's account books, donor lists, sign checks, or know of actions taken by Dodge on his account. In 1999, he sold the party's headquarters for $119,500 saying that he would use the money to build one on his property, but was alleged to have kept the money for himself and moved the party's headquarters to a tool shed.

In 2003, members of the party opposed to him met at a condo in Tennessee and promoted him to chairman emeritus, as a polite way of firing him according to James Hedges. During the 2004 presidential election their faction nominated Gene Amondson under the Concerns of People ballot line while eight delegates from his faction of the party gave him its presidential nomination at his home in Lakewood, Colorado. In the general election he appeared on the ballot in Colorado and received 140 votes while Amondson received 1,944 votes from Colorado and Louisiana.

On June 12, 2007, members of his faction from three states met in a church in Arvada, Colorado, where they nominated him for president and Howard Lydick, who received the vice-presidential nomination in 2004, for vice-president. On November 7, Dodge was waiting to board a flight en route from Denver International Airport to Pennsylvania, when he suddenly collapsed due to cardiac arrhythmia and was taken to the University of Colorado Hospital where he died. Following Dodge's death Howard Lydick worked to unite the two factions of the Prohibition Party behind Gene Amondson before Lydick's own death on August 5, 2008.

Electoral history

Notes

References

External links

1932 births
2007 deaths
20th-century American politicians
21st-century American politicians
1976 United States vice-presidential candidates
1980 United States vice-presidential candidates
American anti-abortion activists
Candidates in the 1984 United States presidential election
Candidates in the 1988 United States presidential election
Candidates in the 1992 United States presidential election
Candidates in the 1996 United States presidential election
Candidates in the 2000 United States presidential election
Candidates in the 2004 United States presidential election
Candidates in the 2008 United States presidential election
Colorado Prohibitionists
Indiana Prohibitionists
Kansas Prohibitionists
Massachusetts Prohibitionists
Michigan Prohibitionists
Politicians from Malden, Massachusetts
Politicians from Denver
Prohibition Party (United States) presidential nominees
Prohibition Party (United States) vice presidential nominees